Inphi Corporation is an American company that produces 10G-800G high-speed analog and mixed-signal semiconductor components and optical subsystems to networking original equipment manufacturers (OEMs), optical module, cloud and telecom service providers. Its headquarters are located in Santa Clara, California. Inphi develops linear transimpedance amplifiers, modulator drivers, optical physical layer devices, coherent DSPs, and silicon photonic-based subsystems for long haul, metro, and data center applications. As of April 20, 2021, the company was acquired by Marvell Technology, Inc.

History 
Inphi was founded in 2000 by Gopal Raghavan, Tim Semones and Loi Nguyen to provide high-speed analog, DSP, and optical semiconductor solutions for the cloud and service provider communication markets. On July 30, 2014, Inphi completed the acquisition of Cortina Systems, Inc., in a transaction valued at $131 million including its High-Speed Interconnect and Optical Transport product lines. On August 4, 2016, Inphi completed the sale of its memory product business to Rambus Inc. for $90 million in cash. In December 2016 they acquired ClariPhy Communications, Inc. for $277 million in cash. On November 11, 2019, Inphi and Synopsys announced the acquisition of eSilicon. As part of the acquisition, Inphi paid $216 million, in both cash and the assumption of debt for eSilicon. This added 2.5D packaging, SerDes and custom silicon design products to the Inphi Portfolio. In February 2020, Inphi announced the world's first 800Gbps PAM4 electro-optics platform.

In October 2020, Marvell Technology, Inc. announced it would acquire Inphi for $8.2 billion. The acquisition completed in April 2021.

Products 
Inphi products include optical and networking physical layer solutions for cloud and telecom markets. Common applications for its products include long haul and metro, inside and between data center interconnects, 5G, access, and cable.
Core technologies:
 High-speed analog ICs
 PAM4
 Coherent DSPs
 Silicon photonics
 Digital signal processors
 TiAs
 Drivers
 Retimers
 Gearbox
 Opto-electronics

Franchise products:
COLORZ
 Polaris™ 1st 200G PAM4 DSP
 Vega™ PAM4 FEC Gearbox Retimer
 Porrima™ 400G PAM4 DSP
 Spica™ 800G DSP
 PAM4 Silicon
 DWDM optical modules

See also 
 Cortina Systems

References 

Companies formerly listed on the New York Stock Exchange
Companies formerly listed on the Nasdaq
Semiconductor companies of the United States
Electronics companies established in 2000
American companies established in 2000
2000 establishments in California
2010 initial public offerings
2021 mergers and acquisitions
Companies based in Santa Clara, California
American corporate subsidiaries